Albert Krauss (sometimes shown as Albert Kraus) was a luger who competed from the 1930s to the 1950s for three countries. He won three bronze medals in the men's doubles for Czechoslovakia at the European luge championships (1934, 1937, 1939). After World War II, Krauss won a bronze medal in the men's singles event for Austria at the 1952 European luge championships in Garmisch-Partenkirchen, West Germany. Three years later, he won a silver medal in the same event for West Germany at the European championships in Hahnenklee.

References
 List of European luge champions 

Austrian male lugers
Czechoslovak male lugers
German male lugers
German Bohemian people
Possibly living people
Year of birth missing
Czechoslovak people of German descent